The 12212 / 12211 Anand Vihar–Muzaffarpur Junction Garib Rath Express is a Superfast Express train of the Garib Rath series belonging to Indian Railways – Northern Railway zone that runs between  and  in India.

It operates as train number 12212 from Anand Vihar Terminal to Muzaffarpur Junction and as train number 12211 in the reverse direction, serving the states of Delhi, Uttar Pradesh & Bihar.

It is part of the Garib Rath Express series launched by the former railway minister of India, Mr. Laloo Prasad Yadav.

Routeing

Traction

Both trains are hauled by a Ghaziabad Electric Loco Shed-based WAP-5 or WAP-7 locomotive on its entire journey.

References 

 http://timesofindia.indiatimes.com/city/patna/New-AC-train-to-link-Sasaram-with-Delhi/articleshow/9045136.cms

External links

Rail transport in Delhi
Rail transport in Uttar Pradesh
Rail transport in Bihar
Garib Rath Express trains
Railway services introduced in 2009